Matthew Curry is an American rock and blues musician from Bloomington, Illinois, United States. Curry originally began playing guitar at the age of 4 with the encouragement of his father. Naturally born a left-hander; Curry's first guitar, described by Matthew as a "cheap-o Walmart guitar," was a right-handed model that he flipped upside down.  Today, he typically plays a left-handed Eric Clapton Signature Fender Stratocaster.
Mostly self-taught, Curry learned to play by playing along to music by artists like ZZ Top and the late Stevie Ray Vaughan.

Touring
Signed to the Paradigm Talent Agency in 2013, Curry is a consistent national touring artist; support has included dates in  support of Peter Frampton, The Steve Miller Band, The Doobie Brothers, and Blackberry Smoke.

In 2015 Curry performed a number of music festivals including, The Beale Street Music Festival,
Wakarusa Music and Camping Festival, and the Summer Camp Music Festival. In April 2014 Curry made his Australian debut with a performance on the Byron Bay Bluesfest in New South Wales, Australia.

In August 2015 Curry was featured by Fender Guitars as a participating artist on the Fender Accelerator Tour. As part of the tour, Fender provided guitars, gear, and promotional tools to emerging artists. Featured artists included The Bots, Coasts (band), Deap Vally, Josh Dorr, Night Terrors of 1927, Priory (band), Marmozets, Real Estate (band), Striking Matches, and Waters (band).

Curry has frequently participated in impromptu jam sessions and blues renditions with past touring headliners including Peter Frampton, The Steve Miller Band, and The Doobie Brothers.

Peter Frampton describes Matthew Curry, "...someone asked me in an interview today if I thought there could be anymore guitar heroes. Well, hell yes of course and Matthew is one who will prove that to be true."

Steve Miller of The Steve Miller Band has described Curry as a, "...wonderful guitar player [and] great songwriter in the Stevie Ray Vaughan area of virtuosity and originality."

Matthew Curry's touring band is: Tim Brickner (bass and backing vocals), Mike Nellas (guitar and backing vocals) and Francis Valentino (drums)

In the Media
Curry made his feature film debut with a speaking role, portraying the late Ronnie Van Zant of Lynyrd Skynyrd, in Joe Dirt 2: Beautiful Loser starring David Spade and directed by Fred Wolf. The film was debuted by Crackle on July 16, 2015.

Discography

If I Don't Got You (2014)
Track List:
If I Don't Got You
New York Blues
Storm's A-Brewing
Walk Out That Door
Hear the Highway
Blinded by the Darkness
Dancing to the Blues
High Water Everywhere
Soulshine

Electric Religion (2015)
Track List:
Love Me Right
Set Me Free
Six String Broken Heart
Put One Over
Hundred Dollar Friend
JMH
Genevieve
Bad Bad Day
Down The Line
Louanna

Shine On (2016)
Track List:
Blink of an Eye
Caroline 
Shine On
Electric Religion
Matter of Time 
Draw the Line

Open Road (2019)
Track List:
Open Road
One More Wrong Night
The Great Midwest
Working it Out
On My Way
Monday Rain
Singing Right Along
Illusion of Hope
I Think of You

Don't Be a Stranger (Single)(2022)

References

External links
Official website
Matthew Curry Facebook
Matthew Curry YouTube
Matthew Curry Twitter
Matthew Curry Spotify
Matthew Curry Apple Music

1995 births
Living people
Blues musicians from Illinois
American rock guitarists
American blues guitarists
American male guitarists
American blues singer-songwriters
Singer-songwriters from Illinois
Guitarists from Illinois
21st-century American male singers
21st-century American singers
21st-century American guitarists
American male singer-songwriters